John P. Schlegel, S.J. (July 30, 1943 – November 15, 2015) was the 23rd President of Creighton University from 2000 to 2011. He formerly served as 26th President of the University of San Francisco from 1991 until 2000.

Biography
Schlegel received his Bachelor of Arts in philosophy and classics from Saint Louis University in 1969. He then completed a master's degree in political science in 1970, also from Saint Louis University. Schlegel also holds a degree in theology, which he obtained from the University of London in 1973, and a doctorate in international relations from Oxford University, which he obtained in 1977.

Schlegel previously served as the executive and academic vice president of John Carroll University in Cleveland, Ohio, before becoming a university president. On October 17, 1991. Schlegel was named the president of the University of San Francisco, succeeding Father John Lo Schiavo, who had served as USF's president for the prior fourteen years. He officially became the 26th President of the University of San Francisco on June 15, 1991.

In 2000, Schlegel was named the President of Creighton University in Omaha. Schlegel is credited with increasing student enrollment during his tenure at Creighton University.
 
In July 2010, Schlegel announced his intent to retire as President of Creighton University at the end of the 2010–2011 academic year. On July 1, 2011, he was succeeded by Father Timothy R. Lannon, who was the previous president of Saint Joseph's University.

On November 15, 2015, Schlegel died as a result of pancreatic cancer.

References

External links
Father Schlegel - President - Creighton University
Creighton University : Conversations with the President

1943 births
2015 deaths
20th-century American Jesuits
21st-century American Jesuits
Presidents of the University of San Francisco
Presidents of Creighton University
People from Dubuque, Iowa
People from Omaha, Nebraska
Saint Louis University alumni
Alumni of the University of London
Alumni of the University of Oxford
Marquette University faculty
John Carroll University faculty
Deaths from cancer in Nebraska
Deaths from pancreatic cancer
Catholics from Iowa
Catholics from Nebraska